The Golden Bullet is a 1917 American Western film featuring Harry Carey.

Cast

Reception
Like many American films of the time, The Golden Bullet was subject to cuts by city and state film censorship boards. The Chicago Board of Censors required cuts of two scenes involving the theft of gold and a shooting.

See also
 Harry Carey filmography
 Hoot Gibson filmography

References

External links
 

1917 films
1917 short films
American silent short films
American black-and-white films
1917 Western (genre) films
Films directed by Fred Kelsey
Universal Pictures short films
Censored films
Silent American Western (genre) films
1910s American films
1910s English-language films